The S9 is a commuter rail service of the Milan suburban railway service, which converges on the city of Milan, Italy.

It uses the Saronno–Seregno, Milan–Chiasso, Milan belt, Milan southern belt and Mortara–Milan railway lines and is operated by Trenord.

Route 

  Saronno ↔ Albairate-Vermezzo

Line S9, a cross-city route, initially heads in an southeasterly direction from Saronno towards Cesano Maderno, Seregno, Monza and Milano Greco Pirelli, then runs via the Milan belt line and southern belt line around the eastern and southern sides of the Milan city centre, before finally heading southwest, to Albairate-Vermezzo.

History
The S9 commenced operation on 24 December 2004, and initially linked Seregno with Milano San Cristoforo. Unlike the other lines in the suburban railway service, which offered services at half-hourly intervals, the S9 ran at a frequency of only one train per hour, in a narrower time band (from 07:00 to 20:00).
 
Thanks to the activation of the S9, local passenger trains returned to the southern belt line after an absence of 10 years.  Another peculiarity of the line was that it was the only one in the suburban railway service not to run along the Passante railway.
 
Initially, the S9 was managed by TiLo, a company formed ad hoc by Trenitalia and the Swiss Federal Railways. In March 2008, Trenitalia became the sole operator.  Upon the timetable change on 13 December 2009, train services on the line became half-hourly throughout the day.
 
In May 2009, following the merger of the Trenitalia's Regional Passenger Division with LeNORD, management of the line was taken over by the merged entity, Trenord.
 
On 12 June 2011, the line was extended from Milano San Cristoforo to Albairate-Vermezzo.

On 9 December 2012, the line was extended from Seregno to Saronno.

On 11 December 2022 the new station Milano Tibaldi was added.

Stations 
The stations on the S9 are as follows (the stations with blue background are in the municipality of Milan):

See also 

 History of rail transport in Italy
 List of Milan suburban railway stations
 Rail transport in Italy
 Transport in Milan

References

External links
 Trenord – official site 
 Schematic of Line S9 – schematic depicting all stations on Line S9

This article is based upon a translation of the Italian language version as at November 2012.

Milan S Lines